This page lists well-known Jewish atheists. Based on Jewish law's emphasis on matrilineal descent, religiously conservative Orthodox Jewish authorities would accept an atheist born to a Jewish mother as fully Jewish. A 2011 study found that half of all American Jews have doubts about the existence of God, compared to 10–15% of other American religious groups.

Entertainment

Cinema

 Woody Allen – American screenwriter, director, actor, comedian, author, playwright, and musician
 David Cronenberg – Canadian filmmaker, screenwriter and actor, one of the principal originators of what is commonly known as the body horror or venereal horror genre
 Stanley Donen – film director and choreographer whose most celebrated works are Singin' in the Rain and On the Town
 Richard Dreyfuss (self -described agnostic) – American actor  
 Sergei Eisenstein – Soviet Russian film director and film theorist
 Harvey Fierstein – American actor, playwright, winner of two Tony Awards
 Stephen Fry –  English actor, screenwriter, author, playwright, journalist, poet, comedian, television presenter, film director and a director of Norwich City Football Club
 Keith Gordon  – American actor and film director
 Nina Hartley – American pornographic actress, pornographic film director, sex educator, feminist, and author
 Alejandro Jodorowsky – Chilean director
 Stanley Kubrick – American film director, writer, film producer, and photographer
 John Landis – American film director, screenwriter, actor, producer, collaborated with Michael Jackson
Fritz Lang – Austrian-American filmmaker, screenwriter, and occasional film producer and actor.
 Marilyn Monroe (1926–1962) – American actress, model, and singer (converted to Reform Judaism to marry Arthur Miller, and remained within Judaism even after her divorce from him).
 Daniel Radcliffe (self-described atheist) – English actor, protagonist of Harry Potter film series
 Harold Ramis (irreligious, agnostic) – American actor, director, and writer specializing in comedy.
 Carl Reiner (self-described Jewish atheist) – American actor, film director, producer, writer, comedian, won nine Emmy Awards and one Grammy Award
 Rob Reiner – American actor, film director, producer, and political activist
 Adrienne Shelly (agnostic) – American actor, screenwriter and director
 Todd Solondz – American independent film screenwriter and director known for his style of dark, thought-provoking, socially conscious satire
 Matt Stone – American actor, voice actor, animator, screenwriter, producer, musician, South Park
 Gene Wilder – American actor

Comedy
 Eric Andre (atheist and practitioner of Transcendental Meditation) – American comedian, actor, producer, and musician.
 David Baddiel ("fundamentalist Jewish atheist") – British comedian and television presenter
 Jack Black – American comedian, actor and musician, Frat Pack comedian group, Golden Globe award
 Michael Ian Black – American comedian, actor, writer, director.
 Rodney Dangerfield (self-described "Logical atheist") - American stand-up comedian.
 David Cross – American actor and comedian
 Larry David (1947–) – American actor, writer, comedian, and producer
 Jay Foreman (1984–) – English YouTuber, singer-songwriter, and comedian.
 Myq Kaplan – American stand-up comedian
 Bill Maher (antitheist, self-described atheist, apatheist and agnostic) – American stand-up comedian, author, host of HBO's Real Time with Bill Maher
 Marc Maron (negative atheist) – American stand-up comedian, radio and podcast host
 Sarah Silverman (irreligious agnostic) – American comedian, writer, actor, singer, musician
 Gene Wilder – American actor

Comic book writers

 Neil Gaiman (agnostic) – English author of short fiction, novels, comic books, graphic novels, audio theatre and films; works include the comic book series The Sandman and novels Stardust, American Gods, Coraline, and The Graveyard Book

Comic book editors

 Stan Lee (agnostic) – American comic book writer, editor, actor, producer, publisher, television personality, and the former president and chairman of Marvel Comics

Music

 Larry Adler – American musician, widely acknowledged as one of the world's most skilled harmonica players
 Irving Berlin (agnostic) – American composer and lyricist of Jewish heritage, widely considered one of the greatest songwriters in American history
 Aaron Copland (agnostic) –  American composer
 Shalom Hanoch – Israeli rock singer, lyricist, composer, father of Israeli rock
 Richard Hell – American singer, songwriter, bass guitarist, and writer
 Billy Joel (1949–) – American pianist, singer-songwriter and composer.
 Howard Kaylan – American rock and roll musician, best known as a founding member and lead singer of the 1960s band The Turtles, and as "Eddie" in the 1970s rock band Flo & Eddie.
 Geddy Lee – Canadian musician, best known as the lead vocalist, bassist, and keyboardist for the Canadian rock group Rush
 Tom Lehrer (agnostic atheist) – American singer-songwriter, satirist, pianist, and mathematician
 Jenny Lewis – American singer-songwriter musician and actress
 Gustav Mahler (agnostic) – Late-Romantic Austrian composer and one of the leading conductors of his generation
 Randy Newman – American singer-songwriter, arranger, composer, and pianist, known for his distinctive voice, mordant (and often satirical) pop songs and for film scores
 Anton Rubinstein – Russian pianist, composer and conductor who became a pivotal figure in Russian culture when he founded the Saint Petersburg Conservatory.
 Kurt Weill (agnostic) – German composer

Radio
 Ira Glass – host of This American Life
 Larry King – American television and radio host.
 Howard Stern (agnostic atheist) – American radio personality, television host, author, actor, and photographer

Sports/games

 Mikhail Botvinnik (1911–1995) – Soviet and Russian grandmaster and three-time World Chess Champion, widely considered one of the greatest chess players of all time

Humanities

Archaeology
 Eleazar Sukenik – Israeli archaeologist and professor of Hebrew University in Jerusalem, undertaking excavations in Jerusalem, and recognising the importance of the Dead Sea Scrolls to Israel

Arts

 Ernst L. Freud – Austrian architect, youngest son of Austrian psychoanalyst Sigmund Freud
 James Lipton – American writer, actor, dean emeritus of the Actors Studio Drama School at Pace University and host of Inside the Actors Studio
 Arthur Miller – American playwright and essayist.
 Jonathan Miller – English theatre and opera director.
 Hannah Moscovitch – Canadian playwright
 Julia Pascal – British playwright and theater director
 Harold Rubin (positive atheist) – South African-born Israeli visual artist and free jazz clarinettist

Historians
 Isaiah Berlin (agnostic) –  British social and political theorist, philosopher and historian of ideas of Russian-Jewish origin, thought by many to be the dominant scholar of his generation
 Raul Hilberg –  Austrian-born American political scientist, scholar of the Holocaust, The Destruction of the European Jews
 Derek J. de Solla Price – British-American historian of science
 Adam Bruno Ulam (agnostic) – Polish and American historian and political scientist at Harvard University; one of the world's foremost authorities on Russia and the Soviet Union; author of twenty books and many articles
 Howard Zinn – American historian, playwright, and activist.
 Yuval Noah Harari – Israeli historian and popular science author. “History began when humans invented gods, and will end when humans become gods”

Law
 Cesare Lombroso – Italian criminologist and physician, founder of the Italian School of Positivist Criminology

Literature

 Isaac Asimov (atheist, humanist and rationalist, identified as "non-observant Jew") – American author and professor of biochemistry at Boston University, best known for his works of science fiction and for his popular science books
 Howard Bloom – American author and scientific thinker
 Alain de Botton – Swiss writer, philosopher, television presenter and entrepreneur, resident in the United Kingdom, author of Religion for Atheists
 Lawrence Bush – author of several books of Jewish fiction and non-fiction, including Waiting for God: The Spiritual Explorations of a Reluctant Atheist and Bessie: A Novel of Love and Revolution
 Daniel Handler – American author better known under the pen name of Lemony Snicket; has declared himself to be "pretty much an atheist" and a secular humanist; has hinted that the Baudelaires in his children's book series A Series of Unfortunate Events might be atheists
 Franz Kafka (agnostic atheist) – influential Czech-born German-language author of novels and short stories
 Janusz Korczak (agnostic) – Polish-Jewish educator, children's author and pediatrician; after spending many years working as director of an orphanage in Warsaw, he refused freedom and remained with the orphans as they were sent to Treblinka extermination camp during the Grossaktion Warsaw of 1942
 Primo Levi – Italian chemist and writer best known for If This Is a Man, an account of his year in Auschwitz
 Sami Michael – Israeli author, President of the Association for Civil Rights in Israel (ACRI)
 Leonard Peikoff – author, philosopher, founder of the Ayn Rand Institute
 Harold Pinter* – Nobel Prize-winning English playwright, screenwriter, director and actor; one of the most influential modern British dramatists, his writing career spanned more than 50 years
 Maurice Bernard Sendak – American writer and illustrator of children's literature, Where the Wild Things Are
 Israel Zangwill – British humorist and writer

Literary critics
 Calel Perechodnik (1916–1943) – Polish Jewish diarist and Jewish Ghetto policeman at the Warsaw Ghetto
 Marcel Reich-Ranicki – Polish-born German literary critic and member of the literary group Gruppe 47

Novelists
 Rebecca Goldstein – American philosophical novelist, essayist, and "New New Atheist" who authored 36 Arguments for the Existence of God: A Work of Fiction
 Stanisław Lem – Polish science fiction novelist and essayist
 Marcel Proust (agnostic atheist) – French novelist, critic, and essayist; best known for his work In Search of Lost Time
 Ayn Rand – Russian-American novelist, playwright, screenwriter, ethical egoist, rationalist, free-market capitalist, founder of the Objectivist philosophy
 Philip Roth – American novelist: Goodbye, Columbus; Portnoy's Complaint
 Boris Strugatsky (agnostic atheist) – Russian science fiction novelist; known for co-writing the science fiction novel Roadside Picnic

Philosophy

 Jacques Derrida – French philosopher, deconstruction, continental philosophy
 Paul Edwards – Austrian-American ethicist
 Sidney Hook (agnostic) – American philosopher of the Pragmatist school, known for his contributions to the philosophy of history, the philosophy of education, political theory, and ethics
 Karl Popper (agnostic) –  Austro-British philosopher, advocate of liberal democracy and free markets, founding member of the Mont Pelerin Society, professor at London School of Economics, falsifiability
 Peter Singer<ref>May, Peter. [http://www.bethinking.org/right-wrong/life-after-god-the-ethics-of-peter-singer.pdf Life after God? – The Ethics of Peter Singer] . "We have no need to postulate gods who hand down commandments to us because we understand ethics as a natural phenomenon."</ref> – Australian ethicist at Princeton University, animal rights advocate
 Ludwig Wittgenstein (agnostic) – Austrian-British philosopher who worked primarily in logic, the philosophy of mathematics, the philosophy of mind, and the philosophy of language.

Formal, natural and applied sciencesNobel laureates are marked with an asterisk (*).Astronomy and cosmology
 Ralph Alpher (agnostic/humanist) – American cosmologist; known for the seminal paper on Big Bang nucleosynthesis, the Alpher–Bethe–Gamow paper
 Hermann Bondi – Anglo-Austrian mathematician and cosmologist, developed steady-state theory, contributed to general theory of relativityIn a letter to the Guardian, Jane Wynne Willson, Vice-President of the British Humanist Association, added to his obituary: "Also president of the Rationalist Press Association from 1982 until his death, and with a particular interest in Indian rationalism, Hermann was a strong supporter of the Atheist Centre in Andhra Pradesh. He and his wife Christine visited the centre a number of times, and the hall in the science museum there bears his name. When presented with a prestigious international award, he divided a large sum of money between the Atheist Centre and women's health projects in Mumbai." Obituary letter: Hermann Bondi, Guardian, September 23, 2005 (accessed April 29, 2008).
 Carl Sagan (agnostic nontheist) – American astronomer, astrophysicist, cosmologist, author, science popularizer, and science communicator in astronomy and natural sciences, Cornell University
 Dennis W. Sciama (1926–1999) – British physicist who played a major role in developing British physics after the Second World War. His most significant work was in general relativity, with and without quantum theory, and black holes. He helped revitalize the classical relativistic alternative to general relativity known as Einstein-Cartan gravity. He is considered one of the fathers of modern cosmology.

Biology and medicine

 Julius Axelrod* – American biochemist, reuptake of catecholamine neurotransmitters, pineal gland, share of the Nobel Prize in Physiology or Medicine
 Rosalind Franklin (agnosticListed as an agnostic on NNDB.com. Rosalind Franklin, NNDB.com.) – British biophysicist and X-ray crystallographer who made critical contributions to the understanding of the fine molecular structures of DNA, RNA, viruses, coal and graphite
 Stephen Jay Gould (agnostic) – American paleontologist, evolutionary biologist, science historian and popularizer. Gould called himself a "Jewish agnostic".
 François Jacob* –  French biologist; with Jacques Monod, originated the idea that control of enzyme levels in all cells occurs through feedback on transcription; Nobel Prize in Medicine
 Rita Levi-Montalcini* (1909–2012) – Italian neurologist; with colleague Stanley Cohen, received the 1986 Nobel Prize in Physiology or Medicine for their discovery of nerve growth factor
 Élie Metchnikoff* – Russian biologist, zoologist and protozoologist; known for his research into the immune system; received the Nobel Prize in Medicine in 1908, shared with Paul Ehrlich
 Max Perutz* – Austrian-born British molecular biologist; shared the 1962 Nobel Prize for Chemistry with John Kendrew, for their studies of the structures of hemoglobin and globular proteins
 Oliver Sacks – British neurologist, who has written popular books about his patients, the most famous of which is Awakenings."All of which makes the Wingate Prize a matter of bemusement. "Yes, tell me," he says, frowning. "What is it, and why are they giving it to an old Jewish atheist who has unkind things to say about Zionism?" "Oliver Burkeman interviewing Sacks, 'Inside Story: Sacks appeal', The Guardian, May 10, 2002, Features Pages, Pg. 4.
 Robert Sapolsky – American neuroscientist, author, Stanford University
 George Wald* – American scientist; known for his work with pigments in the retina; won a share of the 1967 Nobel Prize in Physiology or Medicine with Haldan Keffer Hartline and Ragnar Granit
 Lewis Wolpert – developmental biologist, author, and broadcaster

Chemistry
 Roald Hoffmann* – American theoretical chemist; recipient of the 1981 Nobel Prize in Chemistry
 Jerome Karle* (agnostic) – American physical chemist; with Herbert A. Hauptman, was awarded the Nobel Prize in Chemistry in 1985, for the direct analysis of crystal structures using X-ray scattering techniques
 Harry Kroto* ("devout atheist") – British chemist, share of the Nobel Prize in Chemistry
 George Olah* (agnostic) – 1994 Nobel Laureate in Chemistry, discoverer of superacids
 Dan Shechtman* – 2011 recipient of the Nobel Prize in Chemistry

Computer science and artificial intelligence

 Scott Aaronson (self-described "disbelieving atheist infidel heretic") – American theoretical computer scientist and faculty member in the Electrical Engineering and Computer Science department at MIT
 Jacob Appelbaum – American computer security researcher and hacker; a core member of the Tor project
 John McCarthy – American computer scientist and cognitive scientist; coined the term "artificial intelligence" (AI) and was influential in its early development; developed the Lisp programming language family; significantly influenced the design of the ALGOL programming language; popularized timesharing; won the Turing Award in 1971
 Marvin Minsky – American cognitive scientist and computer scientist in the field of artificial intelligence (AI) at MIT; won the Turing Award in 1969"When we reflect on anything for long enough, we're likely to end up with what we sometimes call "basic" questions – ones we can see no way at all to answer. For we have no perfect way to answer even this question: How can one tell when a question has been properly answered?
What caused the universe, and why? What is the purpose of life? How can you tell which beliefs are true? How can you tell what is good?
These questions seem different on the surface, but all of them share one quality that makes them impossible to answer: all of them are circular! You can never find a final cause, since you must always ask one question more: "What caused that cause?" You can never find any ultimate goal, since you're always obliged to ask, "Then what purpose does that serve?" Whenever you find out why something is good-or is true-you still have to ask what makes that reason good and true. No matter what you discover, at every step, these kinds of questions will always remain, because you have to challenge every answer with, "Why should I accept that answer?" Such circularities can only waste our time by forcing us to repeat, over and over and over again, "What good is Good?" and, "What god made God?" " Marvin Minsky. The Society of Mind.
 Judea Pearl –  Israeli American computer scientist and philosopher; known for championing the probabilistic approach to artificial intelligence and the development of Bayesian networks; won the Turing Award in 2011
 Richard Stallman – American software freedom activist, hacker, and software developer
 Aaron Swartz (1986–2012) – American computer programmer, writer, political organizer and Internet activist; was involved in the development of the web feed format RSS, the organization Creative Commons, the website framework web.py, and the social news site Reddit, in which he was an equal partner after its merger with his company Infogami
 Eliezer Yudkowsky – American artificial intelligence researcher concerned with the singularity and an advocate of friendly artificial intelligence

Engineering
 Hertha Marks Ayrton (agnostic) – English engineer, mathematician and inventor
 Emile Berliner (agnostic"In 1899, Berliner wrote a book, Conclusions, that speaks of his agnostic ideas on religion and philosophy." Seymour Brody, Jewish heroes & heroines of America: 151 true stories of Jewish American heroism (2003), page 119.) – German-born American inventor; known for developing the disc record gramophone (phonograph)
 Dennis Gabor* – Hungarian-British electrical engineer and inventor; known for his invention of holography; received the 1971 Nobel Prize in Physics"The family adopted the Lutheran faith in 1918, and although Gabor nominally remained true to it, religion appears to have had little influence in his life. He later acknowledged the role played by an antireligious humanist education in the development of his ideas and stated his position as being that of a "benevolent agnostic."" "Gabor, Dennis." Complete Dictionary of Scientific Biography. 2008. Encyclopedia.com. (January 30, 2012). 

Mathematics

 Richard E. Bellman – American applied mathematician, known for his invention of dynamic programming in 1953, and important contributions in other fields of mathematics.
 Jacob Bronowski (agnostic) – Polish-Jewish British mathematician, biologist, historian of science, theatre author, poet and inventor;  presenter and writer of the 1973 BBC television documentary series The Ascent of Man, and the accompanying book
 Paul Erdős – (agnostic atheist) Hungarian mathematician, published more papers than any other mathematician in history
 Jacques Hadamard – French mathematician; made major contributions in number theory, complex function theory, differential geometry and partial differential equations
 Herbert A. Hauptman* – American mathematician; with Jerome Karle, won the Nobel Prize in Chemistry in 1985
 Samuel Karlin  – American mathematician, Stanford University
 John von Neumann (agnostic; converted to Roman Catholicism in his final days) – Hungarian-American mathematician and polymath who made major contributions to a vast number of fields, including mathematics, physics, economics, and statistics
 George Pólya (agnostic) – Hungarian Jewish mathematician; professor of mathematics from 1914 to 1940 at ETH Zürich and from 1940 to 1953 at Stanford University; made fundamental contributions to combinatorics, number theory, numerical analysis and probability theory; noted for his work in heuristics and mathematics education
 Laurent Schwartz (1915–2002) – French mathematician; awarded the Fields medal for his work on distributions
 William James Sidis – American mathematician, cosmologist, inventor, linguist, historian and child prodigy
 Alan Sokal (1955–) – American professor of mathematics at University College London and professor of physics at New York University; known for his criticism of postmodernism, resulting in the Sokal affair in 1996
 Hugo Steinhaus – Polish mathematician and educator
 Alfred Tarski – Polish logician and mathematician; prolific author known for his work on model theory, metamathematics, and algebraic logic
 Stanislaw Ulam (agnostic) – Polish-Jewish mathematician; participated in America's Manhattan Project, originated the Teller–Ulam design of thermonuclear weapons, invented the Monte Carlo method of computation, and suggested nuclear pulse propulsion
 André Weil (agnostic) – French mathematician; known for his foundational work in number theory and algebraic geometry
 Norbert Wiener (agnostic) – American mathematician and child prodigy; regarded as the originator of cybernetics
 Oscar Zariski (1899–1986) – American mathematician and one of the most influential algebraic geometers of the 20th century

Physics

 Zhores Alferov* – Soviet and Russian physicist and academic who contributed significantly to the creation of modern heterostructure physics and electronics; inventor of the heterotransistor; winner of 2000 Nobel Prize in Physics
 Hans Bethe* – German-American nuclear physicist; Nobel laureate in physics for his work on the theory of stellar nucleosynthesis; versatile theoretical physicist; made important contributions to quantum electrodynamics, nuclear physics, solid-state physics and astrophysics; during World War II, he was head of the Theoretical Division at the secret Los Alamos laboratory which developed the first atomic bombs; there he played a key role in calculating the critical mass of the weapons, and did theoretical work on the implosion method used in both the Trinity test and the "Fat Man" weapon dropped on Nagasaki, Japan
 David Bohm (agnostic) – American-born British quantum physicist who contributed to theoretical physics, philosophy of mind, and neuropsychology
 Niels Bohr* (1885–1962) – Danish physicist; known for his foundational contributions to understanding atomic structure and quantum mechanics, for which he received the Nobel Prize in Physics in 1922
 David Deutsch – Israeli-British physicist at the University of Oxford; pioneered the field of quantum computation by being the first person to formulate a description for a quantum Turing machine, as well as specifying an algorithm designed to run on a quantum computer
 Paul Ehrenfest (1880–1933) – Austrian-Dutch physicist; made major contributions to the field of statistical mechanics and its relations with quantum mechanics
 Richard Feynman* (positive atheist) – American theoretical physicist known for his work in the path integral formulation of quantum mechanics, the theory of quantum electrodynamics, and the physics of the superfluidity of supercooled liquid helium, as well as in particle physics, Nobel Prize in Physics
 James Franck* – German physicist; won the Nobel Prize in Physics in 1925
 Jerome Isaac Friedman* (agnostic) – American physicist; in 1968–1969, commuting between MIT and California, he conducted experiments with Henry W. Kendall and Richard E. Taylor at the Stanford Linear Accelerator Center which gave the first experimental evidence that protons had an internal structure, later known to be quarks; for this, they shared the 1990 Nobel Prize in Physics;  Institute Professor at the Massachusetts Institute of Technology; member of the Board of Sponsors of the Bulletin of the Atomic Scientists Murray Gell-Mann* (agnostic"So we don’t have to assume these principles as separate metaphysical postulates. They follow from the fundamental theory. They are what we call emergent properties. You don’t need something more to get something more. That’s what emergence means. Life can emerge from physics and chemistry, plus a lot of accidents. The human mind can arise from neurobiology, and a lot of accidents. The way the chemical bond arises from physics and certain accidents. Doesn’t diminish the importance of these subjects, to know that they follow from more fundamental things, plus accidents. That’s a general rule, and it’s critically important to realize that. You don’t need something more in order to get something more. People keep asking that when they read my book, The Quark and the Jaguar, and they say ‘isn’t there something more beyond what you have there?’ Presumably they mean something supernatural. Anyway, there isn’t. (laughs) You don’t need something more to explain something more." Murray Gell-Mann, Beauty and truth in physics: Murray Gell-Mann on TED.com (2007), Ted.com.) – American physicist and linguist who received the 1969 Nobel Prize in Physics for his work on the theory of elementary particles
 Vitaly Ginzburg* – Soviet theoretical physicist; astrophysicist; member of the Russian Academy of Science; a father of the Soviet hydrogen bomb; Nobel Prize in Physics
 Sheldon Glashow* (1932–) – American theoretical physicist. He shared the 1979 Nobel Prize in Physics with Steven Weinberg and Abdus Salam for his contribution to the electroweak unification theory.
 Roy J. Glauber* (agnostic) – American theoretical physicist; awarded half of the 2005 Nobel Prize in Physics "for his contribution to the quantum theory of optical coherence", with the other half shared by John L. Hall and Theodor W. Hänsch
 David Gross* (agnostic) – American particle physicist and string theorist; with Frank Wilczek and David Politzer, was awarded the 2004 Nobel Prize in Physics for their discovery of asymptotic freedom
 Alan Guth – American theoretical physicist and cosmologist
 Lawrence Krauss (1954–) – professor of physics at Arizona State University; popularizer of science; speaks regularly at atheist conferences like Beyond Belief and Atheist Alliance International
 Lev Landau* – Soviet physicist; received the 1962 Nobel Prize in Physics for his development of a mathematical theory of superfluidity"Listed as an atheist in NNDB.com." Lev Landau, NNDB.com
 Leon M. Lederman* – American physicist; with Melvin Schwartz and Jack Steinberger, received the Nobel Prize in Physics in 1988 for their joint research on neutrinos
 Albert A. Michelson* (agnostic) – American physicist known for his work on the measurement of the speed of light and especially for the Michelson–Morley experiment; in 1907 he received the Nobel Prize in Physics
 Yuval Ne'eman (1925–2006) – Israeli theoretical physicist, military scientist, and politician; one of his greatest achievements in physics was his 1961 discovery of the classification of hadrons through the SU(3) flavour symmetry, now named the eightfold way, which was also proposed independently by Murray Gell-Mann
 Frank Oppenheimer (1912–1985) – American particle physicist; professor of physics at the University of Colorado; founder of the Exploratorium in San Francisco; a younger brother of renowned physicist J. Robert Oppenheimer, Frank conducted research on aspects of nuclear physics during the time of the Manhattan Project, and made contributions to uranium enrichment
 J. Robert Oppenheimer (1904–1967) – American theoretical physicist and professor of physics at the University of California, Berkeley; along with Enrico Fermi, he is often called the "father of the atomic bomb" for his role in the Manhattan Project
 Saul Perlmutter* (agnostic) – American astrophysicist; shared both the 2006 Shaw Prize in Astronomy and the 2011 Nobel Prize in Physics with Brian P. Schmidt and Adam Riess for providing evidence that the expansion of the universe is accelerating
 Marshall Rosenbluth – American physicist, nicknamed "the Pope of Plasma Physics"; created the Metropolis algorithm in statistical mechanics, derived the Rosenbluth formula in high-energy physics, and laid the foundations for instability theory in plasma physics
 Joseph Rotblat* (agnostic) –  Polish-British physicist; along with the Pugwash Conferences on Science and World Affairs, he received the Nobel Peace Prize in 1995
 Dennis W. Sciama British physicist who played a major role in developing British physics after the Second World War. His most significant work was in general relativity, with and without quantum theory, and black holes. He helped revitalize the classical relativistic alternative to general relativity known as Einstein–Cartan gravity. He is considered one of the fathers of modern cosmology.
 Lee Smolin – American theoretical physicist; researcher at the Perimeter Institute for Theoretical Physics; adjunct professor of physics at the University of Waterloo
 Jack Steinberger* (atheist/humanistThe International Academy of Humanism  at the website of the Council for Secular Humanism. Retrieved October 18, 2007. Some of this information is also at the International Humanist and Ethical Union  website) – German-American-Swiss physicist; co-discovered the muon neutrino, along with Leon Lederman and Melvin Schwartz, for which they were given the 1988 Nobel Prize in Physics
 Leo Szilard (agnostic) – Austro-Hungarian physicist and inventor
 Edward Teller (agnostic) – Hungarian-American theoretical physicist, known colloquially as "the father of the hydrogen bomb"; made numerous contributions to nuclear and molecular physics, spectroscopy (the Jahn–Teller and Renner–Teller effects), and surface physics
 Joseph Weber – American physicist; gave the earliest public lecture on the principles behind the laser and the maser; developed the first gravitational wave detectors (Weber bars)
 Steven Weinberg* – American theoretical physicist, unification of the weak force and electromagnetic interaction between elementary particles, share of the Nobel Prize in Physics
 Victor Weisskopf – Austrian-born American theoretical physicist
 Eugene Wigner* – Hungarian American theoretical physicist and mathematician; with Maria Goeppert Mayer and J. Hans D. Jensen, received a share of the Nobel Prize in Physics in 1963 "for his contributions to the theory of the atomic nucleus and the elementary particles, particularly through the discovery and application of fundamental symmetry principles";  laid the foundation for the theory of symmetries in quantum mechanics; researched the structure of the atomic nucleus; first identified Xenon-135 "poisoning" in nuclear reactors (sometimes referred to as "Wigner poisoning"); important for his work in pure mathematics, having authored a number of theorems
 Yakov Zeldovich – Soviet physicist born in Belarus; played an important role in the development of Soviet nuclear and thermonuclear weapons; made important contributions to the fields of adsorption and catalysis, shock waves, nuclear physics, particle physics, astrophysics, physical cosmology, and general relativity

Public figuresNobel laureates are marked with an asterisk (*).Activism

 Jose Taf Wine (agnostic) – Colombian-American Freelancer writer and Liberal organizer.
Saul Alinsky (agnostic) – American community organizer and writer; noted for the book Rules for Radicals Hannah Arendt (agnostic) – German-American writer and political theorist
 Alexander Berkman – anarchist known for his political activism and writing; a leading member of the anarchist movement in the early 20th century; while living in France, he continued his work in support of the anarchist movement, producing the classic exposition of anarchist principles, Now and After: The ABC of Communist Anarchism Yaron Brook – political activist, current president and executive director of the Ayn Rand Institute
 Ariel Dorfman (agnostic) – Argentine-Chilean novelist, playwright, essayist, academic, and human rights activist
 Norman Finkelstein –  American political scientist, activist and author whose primary fields of research are the Israeli–Palestinian conflict and the politics of the Holocaust
 Betty Friedan (agnostic) – American writer, activist and feminist; a leading figure in the Women's Movement in the United States; her 1963 book The Feminine Mystique is often credited with sparking the "second wave" of American feminism in the 20th century
 Emma Goldman –  anarchist known for her political activism, writing, and speeches
 Nadine Gordimer* – South African political activist, writer; active in the anti-apartheid movement; Nobel Prize in Literature
 Abbie Hoffman (1936–1989) – American political and social activist
 Ze'ev Jabotinsky (1880–1940) (Agnostic) – Revisionist Zionist (nationalist) leader, author, orator, activist, soldier, and founder of the Jewish Self-Defense Organization in Odessa
 Adam Kokesh – American libertarian anti-war activist and self-professed anarcho-capitalist
 Henry Morgentaler – Canadian physician and prominent pro-choice advocate who has fought numerous legal battles for that cause
 Rosika Schwimmer – Hungarian-born pacifist, feminist, female suffragist
 Elie Wiesel* (agnostic) – Romanian-born Jewish-American writer, professor, political activist and Holocaust survivor; author of 57 books, including Night, a work based on his experiences as a prisoner in the Auschwitz, Buna and Buchenwald concentration camps; awarded the Nobel Peace Prize in 1986

Entrepreneurs

 George Soros – billionaire investor
 Michael SteinhardtMichaelson, Jay. "Memo to Michael Steinhardt: ‘Duh.’". The Jewish Daily Forward. October 17, 2007Rosenblatt, Gary. "On Being Michael Steinhardt". The Jewish Week. February 11, 2010 – American hedge fund manager, investor, and philanthropist active in Jewish causes

Explorers
 Ármin Vámbéry – Hungarian Turkolog and traveler

Military

 Moshe Dayan – Israeli military leader and politician; fourth Chief of Staff of the Israel Defense Forces (1953–58); became Defense Minister and later Foreign Minister of Israel
 Leon Trotsky – Russian Marxist revolutionary and theorist, Soviet politician, founder and first leader of the Red Army

Politics

 Shulamit Aloni – Israeli politician and left-wing activist
 Uri Avnery – Israeli journalist, left-wing peace activist, and former Knesset member
 David Ben-Gurion – Polish-Israeli politician; a founder and the first Prime Minister of modern Israel
 Jorge Sampaio – Agnostic. Served as the 18th President of Portugal, from 1996 to 2006
 Job Cohen Programma: Natafelen met Luuc Smit. Joodse Omroep. Retrieved on 2010-09-09. – Dutch social democratic politician and former legal scholar
 Janet Jagan – American-born socialist politician who was President of Guyana
 Béla Kun – Hungarian revolutionary who led the Hungarian Soviet Republic in 1919
 Golda MeirSee Emma Goldman, "The Philosophy of Atheism," in Christopher Hitchens, ed., The Portable Atheist (Philadelphia: Da Capo Press, 2007), 129–33; Golda Meir is quoted by Jonathan Rosen in  "So Was It Odd of God?", The New York Times, December 14, 2003. – Israeli teacher, kibbutznik, fourth Prime Minister of Israel, Yom Kippur War
 David Miliband – former British Labour Party politician; Member of Parliament from 2001 to 2013; Secretary of State for Foreign and Commonwealth Affairs from 2007 to 2010; older brother of Ed and son of Ralph Miliband (see Sociology section )
 Ed Miliband – British politician and former leader of the Labour Party; younger brother of David and son of Ralph Miliband
 Yitzhak Rabin* – Israeli politician, statesman and general; fifth Prime Minister of Israel; won the 1994 Nobel Peace Prize with Shimon Peres and Yasser Arafat
 Dove-Myer Robinson – mayor of Auckland City, New Zealand 1959–1965, 1968—1980
 Sam Seder – American talk show host, host of The Majority Report and co-host of Ring of Fire Einat Wilf – Israeli former member of the Knesset for the Labor Party.

Public atheists

 Chapman Cohen – leading English atheist, secularist writer and lecturer
 Sam Harris – American author, philosopher, public intellectual, neuroscientist, co-founder and CEO of Project Reason
 Christopher Hitchens – antitheist, author, journalist and orator
 Michael Newdow – American attorney, best known for his efforts to have recitations of the current-version Pledge of Allegiance in public schools declared unconstitutional for the phrase "under God"
 David Silverman – current president of American Atheists, a nonprofit atheist rights advocacy organization

Social sciences
EconomicsNobel laureates are marked with an asterisk (*). David D. Friedman – Chicago School economist, physicist, legal scholar, and libertarian theorist
 Milton Friedman* (negative atheist, agnostic) – American economist, statistician, author, economic adviser to President Ronald Reagan, founding member of Mont Pelerin Society, free market capitalist, Free to Choose, University of Chicago, Chicago School of Economics, Nobel Prize in Economics
 John Harsanyi* – Hungarian-Australian-American economist and Nobel Memorial Prize in Economic Sciences winner
 Karl Marx (self-described atheistThe famous Marxist historian and historiographer Eric Hobsbawm views Marx simply as a Jew, for example, in this October 2005 essay on the "Benefits of Diaspora" in the London Review of Books, in which he states "issues to do with the nature, structure and possible transformations of society in an era of radical historical change both in practice and in theory have attracted emancipated Jews disproportionately almost from the beginning, starting with the Saint Simonians and Marx".) – inventor of Marxist economics
 Ludwig von Mises (agnostic"Indeed, for someone who was an agnostic, Mises wrote a great deal about religion. The number of references he makes to religion is staggering, actually numbering over twenty-five hundred in his published corpus."  Laurence M. Vance, Mises Debunks the Religious Case for the State, Thursday, February 10, 2005.) – Austrian economist, philosopher, free market capitalist, classical liberal, Austrian School of Economics, founding member of Mont Pelerin Society
 Murray Rothbard (self-described atheist) – American economist, historian, political theorist, founder of anarcho-capitalism
 Herbert A. Simon* (1916–2001) – American political scientist, economist, and computer scientist; one of the most influential social scientists of the 20th century; won the Turing Award in 1975 and the Nobel Prize in Economics in 1978
 Piero Sraffa (agnostic) – influential Italian economist whose book Production of Commodities by Means of Commodities is taken as founding the Neo-Ricardian school of Economics
 Joseph Stiglitz* – American economist and Nobel Memorial Prize in Economic Sciences winner

Futurist
 Robert Ettinger – American academic, known as "the father of cryonics" because of the impact of his 1962 book The Prospect of Immortality Herman Kahn – American futurist, military strategist and systems theorist; known for analyzing the likely consequences of nuclear war and recommending ways to improve survivability, a notoriety that made him an inspiration for the title character of Stanley Kubrick's classic black comedy film satire Dr. Strangelove Ray Kurzweil (agnostic) – American author, inventor, futurist, and director of engineering at Google

Journalism

 Isaac Deutscher – Polish-born Jewish Marxist writer, journalist and political activist best known as a biographer of Leon Trotsky and Joseph Stalin and as a commentator on Soviet affairs
 Amy Goodman – American journalist and host of Democracy Now! Glenn Greenwald – American journalist and author
 Amos Oz – Israeli writer, novelist, journalist, professor of literature at Ben-Gurion University in Beersheba
 Catherine Perez-Shakdam – French journalist, political analyst and commentator; formerly a marital convert to Islam

Columnists
 Amy Alkon (negative atheist) – writer of a weekly advice column, Ask the Advice Goddess'', which is published in over 100 newspapers within North America
 Nat Hentoff  – American syndicated columnist and music critic

Psychology

 Albert Ellis ("probabilistic atheist") –  American psychologist who in 1955 developed Rational Emotive Behavior Therapy
 Jerry Fodor –  American philosopher and cognitive scientist, Professor of Philosophy at Rutgers University, the modularity of mind and the language of thought hypotheses
 Sigmund Freud (antitheist) – Austrian neurologist, founding father of psychoanalysis (see also Freud and religion)
 Erich Fromm (1900–1980) – Jewish-German-American social psychologist, psychoanalyst, and humanistic philosopher, associated with the Frankfurt School of critical theory
 Steven Pinker – Canadian-born experimental psychologist, cognitive scientist, linguist and popular science author
 Edwin Shneidman (1918–2009) – American suicidologist and thanatologist
 Boris Sidis – American psychologist, physician, psychiatrist, and philosopher of education
 Carlo Strenger – Swiss-Israeli psychologist, philosopher, existential psychoanalyst, public intellectual, Tel Aviv University

Sociology
 Émile Durkheim (agnostic) – French sociologist
 Claude Lévi-Strauss (1908–2009) – French anthropologist and ethnologist; has been called, along with James George Frazer, the "father of modern anthropology"
 Ralph Miliband – Belgian-born British sociologist known as a prominent Marxist thinker, father of David Miliband (see above)

See also

 Apostasy in Judaism
 Heresy in Judaism
 Jewish atheism
 Jewish Buddhists
 Lists of Jews
 Lists of atheists
 Jewish culture

References

 

Jewish
Atheists

Jewish agnostics